Ghaut may refer to:

 Ghat, either a range of stepped hills with valleys, or the series of steps leading down to a body of water
 Ghaut, a  watercourse in Basseterre Valley, Saint Kitts and Nevis, and Centre Hills, Montserrat 
 The Ghauts, a rocky ridge by Limekilns, Fife, Scotland

See also
 Dhoby Ghaut, a place in Singapore
 Dhoby Ghaut, Penang, a place in Malaysia